John I of Isenburg-Braunsberg was the Count of Isenburg-Braunsberg from 1278 until 1327.

1327 deaths
House of Isenburg
Year of birth unknown